Labes is also the German name of Łobez, Poland. As well as an extinct mammal.
Labes (plural: labes) is a Latin word used by exogeologists to refer to chaotic regions, featuring ridges and steep valleys, in the Valles Marineris region of Mars. Labes are named after the nearest classical albedo feature.

List of labes
This is a list of all named labes. Planetocentric coordinates are given as planetocentric latitude with east longitude.

Surface features of Mars
Lists of Solar System objects